Taha railway station is a railway station located in Taha Township, Fuyu County, Qiqihar, China on the Qiqihar–Bei'an railway. It was put in operation in January 1931.

References

Railway stations in Heilongjiang
Stations on the Qiqihar–Bei'an railway
Railway stations in China opened in 1931